Plaid Hat Games is a United States-based board game studio. Plaid Hat Games was founded in 2009. Board game designer Colby Dauch formed the board game publishing company in order to release the company's first game, Summoner Wars.

In 2015, Plaid Hat Games was acquired by Canadian game publisher F2Z Entertainment. From 2015 to 2020, Plaid Hat Games operated independently as a design and development studio. F2Z USA Corp manages the business logistics, sales, and marketing of all games released by the game publisher. Due to Plaid Hat Games' integration into F2Z Entertainment, every future Plaid Hat Games board game starting in 2016 is to be simultaneously released by French board game publisher Filosofia. 

On February 19, 2020, Head of Studio and Founder Colby Dauch reached an agreement with Asmodee Group to reacquire the independent rights to the Studio and its brand, as well as publication rights to some of their games.

Games published
Summoner Wars, 2009
Dungeon Run , 2011
Mice and Mystics, 2012
BioShock Infinite, 2013
City of Remnants, 2013
Dead of Winter: A Cross Roads Game, 2014
Mice and Mystics: Downwood Tales Expansion, 2014
Ashes: Rise of the Phoenixborn, 2015
Specter Ops, 2015
Tail Feathers, 2015
SeaFall, 2016
Stuffed Fables, 2018
Abomination: The Heir of Frankenstein, 2019
Summoner Wars (Second Edition), 2021

Awards and honors
Summoner Wars

 2009 Best New Game Designer, Dice Tower
 2009 Best Small Publisher, Dice Tower

Dead of Winter: A Cross Roads Game
 2014 Best Innovative Game, Golden Geek Award
 2014 Best Thematic Game, Golden Geek Award
 2014 Best Game Artwork and Presentation Nominee, Golden Geek Award
Summoner Wars (Second Edition)

 2021 Best 2-Player Board Game Nominee, Golden Geek Award

References

External links

Board game publishing companies
American companies established in 2009